Myrteola is a plant genus in the Myrtaceae described as a genus in 1856.  It is native to South America and the Falkland Islands.

These plants are shrubs with leaves no more than 1 cm long, with white flowers of 4 petals and fruits. In some high-altitude paramo areas, the plants are prostrate and form small lawns. Usually grow in rocky places.

Accepted species
 Myrteola acerosa (O.Berg) Burret - Peru
 Myrteola nummularia (Poir.) O.Berg - Falkland Islands, Chile, Argentina, Bolivia, Peru, Ecuador, Colombia, Venezuela
 Myrteola phylicoides (Benth.) Landrum - Bolivia, Peru, Ecuador, Colombia

References

Myrtaceae
Myrtaceae genera
Flora of South America
Páramo flora